Sabre Norris (born 3 January 2005) is an Australian surfer, skater, and YouTuber from Newcastle. She is the eldest child of Olympic swimmer Justin Norris.

Early life
Sabre Norris was born in Newcastle, New South Wales on 3 January 2005 to Olympic butterfly swimmer Justin Norris and his wife Brooke Norris. She is the oldest of six children.

Career
In 2016, at 11 years old Norris became the youngest surfer ever to compete in the open round of the Sydney International Women’s Pro. Her 4 November 2016 interview with Karl Stefanovic captured quite a bit of attention on Australia's Channel Nine's The Today Show; it reportedly attracted over 2 million views prompting an appearance on The Ellen DeGeneres Show which was viewed 40 million times.

Norris is an accomplished skateboarder and although she has been diagnosed with Chiari malformation, it did not impede her selection in the Australian skateboarding squad for the 2020 Tokyo Olympics. She is the third female in history and first Australian female to land a "540".

In 2018 she won a silver medal in skateboarding at the X Games (becoming the first woman to land a McTwist on a skateboard at an X Games); won the Bondi Bowl-A-Rama; and finished in second place in the Vans Park Series Oceania Championships. In 2019 the ABC published the biographical podcast Sabre Norris — the girl who shreds waves and skate parks.

In 2021 she appeared in the documentary film Tall Poppy: A Skater's Story, about 21-year-old Australian skateboarder Poppy Starr Olsen.

Personal life
Norris and her family have a YouTube channel called the “Norris Nuts”, which focuses on her and her five younger siblings birthdays, gaming, and performing challenges. They also record songs together for the channel. As of 2022 they have around 6 million subscribers.

References

Living people
Place of birth missing (living people)
Australian skateboarders
People from Newcastle, New South Wales
2005 births